Zerendi (Zerendı) is a small town in northern-central Kazakhstan, located 45 kilometres from Kokshetau. It is the seat of Zerendi District in Aqmola Region. Pop 6,800 (1998). Zerendi lies on Lake Zerenda, which is surrounded by small mountains covered with forest. Magnificent nature of this lake attracts many tourists from Russia, Germany and Ukraine.

History
In 1824 Cossacks from Siberia founded a small settlement.

Sights
Zerendi has several places of interest: The Lake Zerenda, The Green Cape, Bear Mount.
The major part of Zerenda Lake coastline belongs to private owners, especially western coastline. There are several resort centers there: Zeren, Kharagahjly, Kazakhoil. On the Raspberry Cape there is also a summer residence of the president of the Republic of Kazakhstan.

External links
Official site

Populated places in Akmola Region